This is a list of the Irish Recorded Music Association's Irish Singles Chart Top 50 number-ones of 2006.

See also
2006 in music
List of artists who reached number one in Ireland
Irish Singles Chart

External links
Current Irish Singles Chart – Top 50 Positions

2006 in Irish music
Ireland Singles
2006